Victor Johann Mutt (also Viktor Johann Mutt; 25 May 1886 Tuhalaane Parish (now Mulgi Parish), Kreis Fellin – 30 April 1942 Kirov Prison, Russian SFSR) was an Estonian military colonel, diplomat and politician. He was a member of II Riigikogu. On 10 March 1924, he resigned his position and he was replaced by Paul-Eduard Luiga. Mutt was arrested by the NKVD on 30 June 1940 and sentenced to death. He was executed in Kirov Prison in 1942.

Mutt's sons were chemist Viktor Mutt and linguist and translator Oleg Mutt and his grandson is writer Mihkel Mutt.

References

1886 births
1942 deaths
People from Mulgi Parish
People from Kreis Fellin
Estonian People's Party politicians
Members of the Riigikogu, 1923–1926
Estonian diplomats
Russian military personnel of World War I
Estonian military personnel of the Estonian War of Independence
Recipients of the Cross of Liberty (Estonia)
Estonian people executed by the Soviet Union